The 2016 season was Yorkshire Diamonds' first season, in which they competed in the Women's Cricket Super League, a Twenty20 competition. The side finished fifth in the group stage, winning one of their five matches.

The side was partnered with Yorkshire County Cricket Club, and played their home matches at Headingley Cricket Ground. They were captained by Lauren Winfield and coached by Richard Pyrah.

Squad
Yorkshire Diamonds announced their 15-player squad on 21 April 2016. Age given is at the start of Yorkshire Diamonds' first match of the season (30 July 2016).

Women's Cricket Super League

Season standings

 Advanced to the Final.
 Advanced to the Semi-final.

League stage

Statistics

Batting

Bowling

Fielding

Wicket-keeping

References

Yorkshire Diamonds seasons
2016 in English women's cricket